Michael Hirst may refer to:

 Michael Hirst (politician) (born 1946), former Scottish Conservative and Unionist Party politician
 Michael Hirst (writer) (born 1952), screenwriter of Elizabeth (1998) and creator of The Tudors (2007–2010)
 Michael Hirst (art historian) (1933–2017), art historian, monographer of Sebastiano del Piombo

See also
Michael Hurst (disambiguation)